Yonkaira Paola Peña Isabel (born May 5, 1993 in Santo Domingo) is a Dominican volleyball player, who plays as an outside hitter. She was a member of the Women's National Team, who won the bronze medal with her native country at the 2008 NORCECA Girls' U18 Volleyball Continental Championship in Guaynabo, Puerto Rico wearing the number #16 jersey.

Career
She played for Chemik Police for the 2015/16 season. Peña signed for the Brazilian club Sesc-RJ.

Clubs
  Mirador (2010–2011)
  Universidad de San Martín de Porres (2011–2013)
  Toray Arrows (2013–2014)
  Bursa BBSK (2014–2015)
  Chemik Police (2015–2016)
  Rio de Janeiro VC (2017–)

Awards

Individuals
 2012 U23 Pan-American Volleyball Cup "MVP"
 2015 NORCECA Championship "Best Outside Hitter"

Clubs
 2011–12 Peruvian League –  Runner-up, with Universidad de San Martín de Porres
 2012–13 Peruvian League –  Runner-up, with Universidad de San Martín de Porres
 2013–14 Japanese League –  Bronze medal, with Toray Arrows
 2014–15 CEV Challenge Cup –  Champions, with Bursa BBSK
 2015-16 Polish Supercup -  Champions, with Chemik Police
 2015-16 Polish League –  Champions, with Chemik Police
 2015-16 Polish Cup –  Champions, with Chemik Police
 2018 South American Club Championship –  Runner-up, with Rio de Janeiro
 2017–18 Brazilian Superliga –  Runner-up, with Rio de Janeiro
 2018 Carioca Championship –  Champions, with Rio de Janeiro

References

External links
 FIVB Profile

1993 births
Living people
Place of birth missing (living people)
Expatriate volleyball players in Peru
Dominican Republic women's volleyball players
Expatriate volleyball players in Turkey
Expatriate volleyball players in Japan
Volleyball players at the 2015 Pan American Games
Pan American Games bronze medalists for the Dominican Republic
Pan American Games medalists in volleyball
Central American and Caribbean Games gold medalists for the Dominican Republic
Competitors at the 2014 Central American and Caribbean Games
Expatriate volleyball players in Poland
Expatriate volleyball players in Brazil
Dominican Republic expatriate sportspeople in Japan
Dominican Republic expatriates in Peru
Dominican Republic expatriates in Brazil
Bursa Büyükşehir Belediyespor athletes
Central American and Caribbean Games medalists in volleyball
Medalists at the 2015 Pan American Games
Volleyball players at the 2020 Summer Olympics
Olympic volleyball players of the Dominican Republic